Sacks is a German surname meaning "man from Saxony" and may refer to:
 Alan Sacks, US television producer
 Andrew Sacks, US attorney
 C. Jared Sacks, US founder of Channel Classics Records
 David O. Sacks (b. 1972), South Africa-born US internet businessman and film producer
 David Sacks (fl. 21st century), US television writer and producer
 Gerald Sacks (b. 1933), US logician
 Glenn Sacks (fl. 21st century), US radio personality
 Greg Sacks (b. 1952), US racing car driver
 Harvey Sacks (1935–1975), US sociologist
 Hayley Anne Sacks (b. 1991), US figure skater who competed for Israel
 Joel Sacks (b. 1989), Argentine football (soccer) player
 Jonathan Sacks (1948–2020), Chief Rabbi of the United Kingdom's main body of Orthodox synagogues
 Jonathan Sacks (composer) (b. 1950), US musician and composer
 Leon Sacks (1902–1972), Democratic member of US House of Representatives
 Leslie Sacks (1952-2013), US art dealer and collector
 Mark Sacks (1953-2008), British philosopher
 Martin Sacks (b. 1959), Australian actor
 Michael Sacks (b. 1948), US actor
 Mike Sacks, US author, humor writer, and magazine editor
 Nathan Sacks, South African football (soccer) player
 Oliver Sacks (1933-2015), English-born US neurologist and author
 Peter M. Sacks (b. 1950), South African-born US artist and poet
 Rodney Sacks American businessman
 Ruth Sacks (b. 1977), South African artist
 Yonason Sacks (fl. 21st century), US rabbi

See also
 
 
 Sachs, a variant of the surname Sacks
 Sachse, Texas, United States
 Sack (disambiguation)
 Saks (disambiguation)
 Sax (disambiguation)
 Saxe (disambiguation)
 Small-angle X-ray scattering (SAXS)
 Zaks (disambiguation)
 Zaks, a building toy
 Zax (disambiguation)